Baye Gueye Ndiaga (born 20 October 1975) is a former Senegalese professional football player.

Career
He played 2 games and scored 1 goal for FC Rubin Kazan in the Russian Premier League in the 2003 season, when they took the bronze medals.

References

External links
 

1975 births
Footballers from Dakar
Living people
Senegalese footballers
Senegalese expatriate footballers
Expatriate footballers in Russia
Russian Premier League players
FC Rubin Kazan players
ASC Jaraaf players
Association football midfielders